The Very Best of Chic is a compilation album of recordings by American R&B band Chic, released by Rhino Records/Warner Music in 2000. The compilation covers the band's hits and best-known album tracks recorded between the years 1977 and 1982. All selections are original full-length album versions.

Track listing
All tracks written by Bernard Edwards and Nile Rodgers unless otherwise noted.
"Dance, Dance, Dance (Yowsah, Yowsah, Yowsah)" (Kenny Lehman)
 From 1977 album Chic
"Everybody Dance"  - 6:42
 From 1977 album Chic
"Le Freak"  – 5:23
 From 1978 album C'est Chic
"I Want Your Love"  - 6:45
 From 1978 album C'est Chic
"Good Times"  - 8:13
 From 1979 album Risqué
"My Forbidden Lover"   - 4:42
 From 1979 album Risqué
"What About Me"  - 4:14
 From 1979 album Risqué
"My Feet Keep Dancing"  - 6:46
 From 1979 album Risqué
"Rebels Are We"  - 4:56
 From 1980 album Real People
"Real People"  - 5:20
 From 1980 album Real People
"Stage Fright"  - 3:57
 From 1981 album Take It Off
"Just Out of Reach"  - 3:46
 From 1981 album Take It Off
"Soup for One"  - 5:35
 From 1982 soundtrack album Soup For One

Production
 Bernard Edwards - producer for Chic Organization Ltd.
 Nile Rodgers - producer for Chic Organization Ltd.

References

Chic (band) compilation albums
Albums produced by Nile Rodgers
Albums produced by Bernard Edwards
2000 greatest hits albums